La Uvita is a town and municipality in the Northern Boyacá Province, part of the Colombian Department of Boyacá. La Uvita borders San Mateo in the north, El Cocuy and Chita in the east, Chita and Jericó in the south and Boavita in the west.

Etymology 
La Uvita is derived from Chibcha, meaning "meadow of the fertile farmlands".

History 
La Uvita was founded by Vicente Ferrer del Río de Loza on December 24, 1758, as a place for the colonial inhabitants of Boavita to flee the indigenous people in Boavita.

Economy 
Main economic activity of La Uvita is the manufacturing of cheese. It also serves as a touristic entry to the El Cocuy National Park.

Gallery

References 

Municipalities of Boyacá Department
Muisca Confederation
Populated places established in 1758
1750s establishments in the Viceroyalty of New Granada
1758 establishments in South America